The state of Goa, in India, is famous for its beaches and places of worship. Tourism is its primary industry, and is generally focused on the coastal areas of Goa, with decreased tourist activity inland.

Foreign tourists, mostly from Europe, arrive in Goa in winter, whilst the summer and monsoon seasons see many Indian tourists. Goa handled 2.29% of all foreign tourist arrivals in the country in 2011. This relatively small state is situated on the west coast of India, between the borders of Maharashtra and Karnataka, and is better known to the world as a former Portuguese enclave on Indian soil. Thus, Tourism forms the backbone of Goa's economy.

Major tourist attractions include Bom Jesus Basilica, Fort Aguada, a wax museum on Indian culture, and a heritage museum. The Churches and Convents of Goa have been declared a World Heritage Site by UNESCO.

As of 2013, Goa was the destination of choice for Indian and foreign tourists, particularly Britons, with limited means who wanted to party. The state was hopeful that changes could be made which would attract a more upscale demographic.

On 24 November 2017, Delta Corp Limited claimed to have set up the first casino game training course centre in India at Goa.

Goa also draws tourists from all over India for its bungee activity, water sports and underwater scuba diving experience.

Beaches 

These beaches are divided into North and South Goa.

North Goa Beaches 
 Pernem
 Querim Beach,
 Kalacha Beach,
 Arambol Beach,
 Mandrem Beach,
 Ashvem Beach,
 Morjim Beach,

 Bardez
 Chapora Beach,
 Vagator Beach,
 Ozran Beach,
 Anjuna Beach,
 Baga Beach,
 Calangute Beach,
 Candolim Beach,
 Sinquerim Beach,
 Coco Beach,
 Kegdole beach

 Tiswadi
 Miramar Beach,
 Caranzalem Beach,
 Dona Paula Beach,
 Vaiguinim Beach,
 Bambolim Beach,
 Siridao Beach

South Goa Beaches

 Mormugao
 Bogmalo Beach,
 Baina Beach,
 Hansa Beach,
 Hollant Beach,
 Cansaulim Beach,
 Velsao Beach

 Salcete
 Arossim Beach,
 Utorda Beach,
 Majorda Beach,
 Betalbatim Beach,
 Colva Beach,
 Sernabatim Beach,
 Benaulim Beach,
 Varca Beach,
 Cavelossim Beach,
 Mobor Beach,
 Betul Beach

 Quepem
 Canaiguinim Beach

 Canacona
 Cabo de rama Beach,
 Kakolem Beach,
 Dharvalem Beach,
 Cola Beach,
 Agonda Beach,
 Palolem Beach,
 Patnem Beach,
 Rajbag Beach,
 Talpona Beach,
 Galgibag Beach,
 Polem Beach

Sea plane service
The government of Goa conducted trials of a seaplane on the Mandovi river on 23 May 2015. The test plane took off from Dabolim airport and successfully landed in the Mandovi river. The seaplane service had started post-monsoon since 2015.

Wildlife

Bondla Wildlife Sanctuary, Bhagwan Mahaveer Sanctuary and Mollem National Park, Cotigao Wildlife Sanctuary, Mhadei Wildlife Sanctuary and Netravali Wildlife Sanctuary harbour Goa's rich bio-diversity. Foxes, wild boars and migratory birds are also found in the forests of Goa. The avifauna includes kingfishers, mynas and parrots.
The famous Dudhsagar Falls, India's fifth tallest at 310 metres, is located inside Bhagwan Mahaveer Sanctuary at the Goa – Karnataka border.

The renowned Salim Ali Bird Sanctuary is located on the island of Chorao. The endangered olive ridley sea turtle can be found on Morjim Beach in Pernem, Northern Goa and Galgibaga Beach in Canacona, Southern Goa. The turtles are listed in Schedule I of the Indian Wildlife Act. Morjim Beach is also hosting to a number of migratory birds from late September to early April. The area surrounding the shore at Tembwada in Morjim also abounds in various species of birds. A number of international bird watching tours are organised in the area.

Waterfalls
Dudhsagar Falls	
Arvalem Falls		
Kuske falls		
Kesarval Falls		
Tambdi Surla Falls
Charavane falls

Museums

There are several museums located in Goa:
The Goa State Museum set up in 1996 aims at centralising and preserving antiquities, art objects and objects of cultural importance, depicting the different aspects of the Goan History and Culture. It is located at Patto in Goa's capital city of Panaji.
The Naval Aviation Museum near Dabolim is one among three of its kind in India.
Goa Science Centre, located at the Miramar beach in Panaji. was opened in December 2001 and it houses many wonders of Science and Astronomy.
Archaeological Museum and Portrait Gallery located in Old Goa is run by the Archaeological Survey of India.
The Museum of Christian Art has a number of paintings, sculptures and religious silverware dating back to the 16th century.
'Ancestral Goa' is dedicated to the preservation of art, culture and environment and was established to preserve Goa's past and its rich traditions. This magnificent project is the result of a lot of meticulous research, planning and hardwork. Located in Loutolim, it opened to the public in April 1995. A special attraction of this project is the sculpture of Sant Mirabai strumming on her tambori and measuring 14 meters by 5 meters which was chiseled in Greco – Roman style from a vast expanse of laterite stone by Maendra Jocelino Araujo Alvares in just 30 days.
The Big Foot Museum is located at 'Ancestral Goa' in Loutolim. It has an unusual collection of crosses, from all over the world.
The Museum of Goa is a privately owned museum of art in Pilerne, Goa. MOG, as it is commonly known, is one of the largest contemporary art spaces in India. Founded by the artist, Dr. Subodh Kerkar, in 2015, MOG tries to depict Goan history and culture through modern art. The Museum is also an active cultural space, hosting events, talks, workshops and discussions. MOG hosts exhibitions all year round, with its largest being the Goa Affordable Art Fest which often starts in December and lasts till the end of January.
 The Pilar Museum is located on the Pilar hillock where the Pilar Seminary is also located. The Museum was founded by Fr Costa, and highlights various finds on and around the Pilar hillock and now preserved in the seminary museum.
The 'Wax World' Museum, inaugurated in 2008 is located in Old Goa contains exquisite wax statues. The statues have been sculpted by Shreeji Bhaskaran, who owns the museum and is also responsible for giving India its first wax museum located at Ooty, Karnataka, which was set up in March 2007.
'Goa Chitra Museum', established by Victor Hugo Gomes, is an ethnographic museum in Benaulim showcasing traditional Goan farming implements and other Goan antiques.
 Ashvek Vintage World is a vintage car museum located in Nuvem, Goa. Set up in 2004 by Pradeep Naik, it is Goa's first car museum.

Heritage homes
Another major tourist attraction in Goa is its heritage homes. A legacy of the Portuguese colonial regime of more than 450 years, some of these palatial homes are now converted into hotels while many are still inhabited by the people. The popular heritage homes in Goa are:
 The Fernandes house, also known as 'Voddlem Ghor' in Cotta is an architectural marvel in Chandor.
 The Menezes Bragança House in Chandor was built circa 1730. It was once owned by Luís de Menezes Bragança, Tristão de Bragança Cunha, Beatriz de Menezes Bragança, and her sister Berta Menezes Bragança.
 The Vivian Coutinho House in Fatorda is among the few Goan houses with decorative Azulejo tiles.

Forts

The landscape of Goa is dotted with several forts.

 Aguada Fort
 Alorna Fort
 Anjediva Fort
 Betul Fort 
 Cabo de Rama
 Chandor Fort
 Chapora Fort
 Corjuem Fort
 Gandaulim Fort
 Gaspar Dias Fort
 Mormugão Fort
 Nanuz Fort
 Naroa Fort
 Palácio do Cabo
 Ponda Fort
 Rachol Fort
 Reis Magos
 Sanquelim Fort
 Fortaleza de São Sebastião
 São Tiago of Banastarim Fort
 São Tomé of Tivim Fort
 St Estevam Fort
 Tiracol Fort

List of monuments of national importance 

|}

List of state protected monuments 

|}

Administration
The administration of tourism in Goa lies with Minister for Tourism, Manohar Ajgaonkar, and Secretary and Director for Tourism, Menino D'Souza. Other stakeholders in Goa tourism are the Goa Tourism Development Corporation (A Government of Goa undertaking) and the Travel and Tourism Association of Goa (TTAG). Prachi Desai has been appointed as the face of Goa's Tourism.

Goa Tourism Development Corporation
The Goa Tourism Development Corporation Ltd. (GTDC) carries out tourism commercial activities like conducting sight seeing tours and river cruises. It also manages 12 hotels with a total of 525 rooms. Also, tourist can opt-in from tourism site in India. They are recognised by tourism minister of India, the government of India to boost Indian tourism sector by providing a world-class tour to tourist.

See also

Damaon territory
Portuguese in Goa and Bombay
Indo-Portuguese
Christianity in India
Tourism in India
Timeline of Goan history

Outline of tourism in India

 List of World Heritage Sites in India
 List of national parks of India
 List of lakes of India
 List of waterfalls in India
 List of State Protected Monuments in India
 List of beaches in India
 Incredible India
 List of Geographical Indications in India
 Medical tourism in India
 List of botanical gardens in India
 List of hill stations in India
 List of gates in India
 List of zoos in India
 List of protected areas of India
 List of aquaria in India
 List of forts in India
 List of forests in India
 Buddhist pilgrimage sites in India
 Hindu pilgrimage sites in India
 List of rock-cut temples in India
 Wildlife sanctuaries of India
 List of rivers of India
 List of mountains in India
 List of ecoregions in India
 Coral reefs in India
 List of stadiums in India

References